Flowers is the third album by the Swedish pop music group Ace of Base. It was released on 15 June 1998 in Europe, Asia, and Africa, and 10 August 1998 in the United Kingdom.  An alternative album titled Cruel Summer, was released in the USA and Canada, containing remixes, re-recordings, and new songs deemed appropriate for an American audience.  Japan and Australia received hybrid versions of the two albums.

The album was re-issued in the UK on 26 April 1999 with revised artwork and tracklisting, following the single release of "Everytime It Rains".

Background
Flowers spawned the singles "Life Is a Flower", "Cruel Summer" and "Always Have, Always Will".

Track listing

Notes
 signifies an additional producer
 signifies pre-production

Release history

Charts

Weekly charts

Year-end charts

Certifications

References

Ace of Base albums
1998 albums
Albums produced by Stephen Hague
Edel-Mega Records albums